Fairwind may refer to one of the following ships:

 , an ocean liner which sailed under the name SS Fairwind between 1968 and 1988
 , an Australian ship wrecked off the New South Wales coast in 1950

Ship names